Life Itself is a 2018 American drama film written, co-produced and directed by Dan Fogelman. It stars Oscar Isaac, Olivia Wilde, Mandy Patinkin, Olivia Cooke, Laia Costa, Annette Bening, and Antonio Banderas, and follows multiple couples over numerous generations, and their connections to a single event.

The film had its world premiere at the Toronto International Film Festival on September 8, 2018, and was theatrically released in the United States on September 21, 2018, by Amazon Studios. Life Itself received largely negative reviews from critics, who called it "simultaneously overwrought and underwhelming."

Plot 

Chapter One – The Hero
Narrator Samuel L. Jackson first introduces the hero of the story, Henry, as he is talking to his therapist, Dr. Cait Morris (Annette Bening). Unimpressed with Henry, he focuses on Cait. As she is crossing the street, Will Dempsey (Oscar Isaac) tells her he is a big fan and she is then hit by a bus. Sam breaks the narration, appears physically, and suggests that Cait will be fine because she is the hero. When he sees that she is dead, he leaves.

It is then revealed that this scene is part of a script that Will is writing, and another narrator (Lorenza Izzo) takes over, telling the actual story. Cait is actually Will's therapist, and he has been seeing her since he was discharged from a psychiatric hospital. Flashbacks show Will and his wife Abby's (Olivia Wilde) married life. She is a Dylan fan, and is very pregnant.

Will tells Cait about Abby. Her parents died in a car accident, while she sat in the backseat. She had to live with her only family member: her Uncle Joe (Bryant Carroll), who sexually abused her until her teens, when she threatened to shoot him dead if he touched her again.

Abby and Will meet, become friends in college, he asks her out and less than a year later, proposes. She meets his parents Irwin (Mandy Patinkin) and Linda (Jean Smart). On another occasion, Abby excitedly talks to Will about her thesis on the unreliable narrator: that life is the ultimate unreliable narrator as it is so tricky and surprising.

In the present day, Will wonders what happened. Cait tells Will that he was institutionalized following Abby leaving, pushing him to remember the details of "that day". Walking down the street after having lunch with his parents, Abby announced they were having a girl and wanted to name her Dylan. Distracted, Abby was struck by a bus, while a little boy watched from inside. She died and the baby survived. Will, blaming himself, shoots himself in front of Cait.

Chapter Two – Dylan Dempsey
Will and Abby's daughter Dylan, born of death and tragedy, seems to have a dark cloud following her. Raised by her grandparents, Linda passes away when Dylan is 6. Her dog dies when she is 7, leading to a talk with Irwin about death. On her 21st birthday, Dylan (Olivia Cooke) gets ready to go out, and then performs a rendition of To Make You Feel My Love with her band.

After the show, Dylan fights another girl before leaving the venue. Sitting down on a bench to smoke a joint, she imagines watching her mother's final moment. Waking up crying with the bus in front of her, she seemingly sees the young boy on the bus asking her if she is okay.

Chapter Three – The Gonzalez Family
In Spain, Vincent Saccione (Antonio Banderas) owns an olive plantation. Inviting his worker, Javier Gonzalez (Sergio Peris-Mencheta), into the house for a drink, he tells him how his Italian father impregnated his Spanish mother and then shunned them both. Saccione inherited his wealth and land as his father left no will. He offers Javier the position of foreman, which includes living in the house.

Javier visits his beloved girlfriend Isabel Diaz (Laia Costa), telling her about his promotion. They build a life together, getting married and becoming parents to Rodrigo. Saccione often visits mother and son while Javier is out working. After Saccione gifts him a globe, Rodrigo becomes interested in seeing NYC. Saccione tells Isabel he feels it is too late for him to find the happiness Javier has, apologizing for intruding. Isabel assures Saccione that Rodrigo enjoys his visits. However, Javier disapproves and returns the globe.

Javier takes Isabel and Rodrigo to see NYC. Rodrigo is having a great time, until they find themselves on the bus. Distracting the bus driver causes him to hit Abby, and he becomes traumatized.

Back home, Javier and Isabel struggle to take care of sleepless Rodrigo, straining the marriage. They ask Saccione to help Rodrigo, making Javier jealous. Feeling that his wife and son love Saccione more than him, he confronts Saccione, asking if he loves them both. When he guiltily says yes, Javier leaves, although Isabel insists she loves her life with him. She stays with Saccione, but makes it clear she will not love him like she loves Javier.

Chapter Four – Rodrigo Gonzalez
Rodrigo (Alex Monner) grows up and goes to college in NYC. He starts a relationship with Shari, a fellow student from a Long Island family. He returns home when Isabel contracts cancer. Rodrigo wants to stay with her, but she tells him goodbye.

The most important day in Rodrigo's life starts with Shari telling him she is pregnant. When later she says it was just an April Fool's prank, Rodrigo breaks up with her feeling flabbergasted and culturally out of sync. In Spain, Isabel has little time left and Javier arrives for the first time in years. Apparently, Saccione had kept him updated on his wife and son, so he spends one final moment with Isabel. Getting the news his mom had died, distraught, Rodrigo goes for a run through the city. Coming across Dylan crying on the bench, he asks her if she is okay.

Chapter Five – Elena Dempsey-Gonzalez
The narrator is Elena (Lorenza Izzo), Dylan and Rodrigo's daughter. Reading from her book, "Life Itself", the story of everything that led to her parents' meeting, she repeats what Isabel told Rodrigo: even if life brings us to our knees, if we look hard enough, we will find love. She concludes her story saying that one moment shaped her entire life, and that she sees both of her grandmothers (Abby and Isabel) in herself.

The last scene is a brief clip of Will admiring a pregnant Abby.

Cast

Production
In August 2016, FilmNation Entertainment acquired the film's script, by Dan Fogelman, who also directed the film; FilmNation had bought the script after it appeared on The Black List. Marty Bowen and Wyck Godfrey served as producers on the film under their Temple Hill Entertainment banner. In November 2016, Oscar Isaac joined the cast. In January 2017, Olivia Cooke, Antonio Banderas, Samuel L. Jackson, Olivia Wilde and Laia Costa were also added, and in March 2017, Annette Bening joined as well, alongside Mandy Patinkin and Alex Monner.

Principal photography began on March 13, 2017 in New York City, and continued in Spain in May.

Release
In December 2017, a fierce bidding war for distribution rights for the film, fought between Amazon Studios, Universal Pictures, and Paramount Pictures, concluded with Amazon Studios winning the rights with a $10-million-dollar-plus bid.

The film premiered on September 8, 2018, at the Toronto International Film Festival, and was theatrically released on September 21, 2018, in the United States. It was released on January 4, 2019, in the United Kingdom.

Reception

Box office
In the United States and Canada and China, Life Itself was released alongside The House with a Clock in Its Walls, Assassination Nation and Fahrenheit 11/9, and was projected to gross $4–6 million from 2,578 theaters during its opening weekend. It brought in $2.1 million over its first weekend, finishing 11th, behind a number of films that ranged from their second to seventh week in theaters. This was the second worst opening, since 1982, by a film that opened at over 2,500 theaters.

Critical response
The website's critical consensus reads, "A mawkish melodrama that means less the more it tries to say, Life Itself suggests writer-director Dan Fogelman's talents are best suited to television." On Metacritic, the film has a weighted average score of 21 out of 100, based on reviews from 39 critics, indicating "generally unfavorable reviews". Audiences polled by CinemaScore gave the film an average grade of "B+" on an A+ to F scale, while PostTrak reported filmgoers gave it 2.5 out of 5 stars and a 47% "definite recommend".

Kate Erbland of IndieWire gave the film a "D", saying: "Life Itself thinks you're stupid. Or, if not stupid, unable to understand how a movie should work. It's a movie made for people who can't be trusted to understand any storytelling unless it's not just spoon-fed but ladled on, piled high, and explained via montage and voiceover." A. O. Scott, chief film critic for The New York Times, calls it an "inadvertently hilarious" film, filled with "parental slaughter ... (where) mothers and fathers are hit by buses, perish in car accidents, commit suicide and succumb to cancer," though he praises Isaac, Wilde, Costa, and Peris-Mencheta (playing the "starting" couples in the two countries) for their acting.

References

External links
 

2018 films
American drama films
Films set in New York City
Films set in Spain
Films set in the future
Films shot in New York City
FilmNation Entertainment films
2010s Spanish-language films
2018 drama films
Films directed by Dan Fogelman
Films with screenplays by Dan Fogelman
Films scored by Federico Jusid
Amazon Studios films
Films produced by Wyck Godfrey
2010s English-language films
2010s American films